The Zavodskoy constituency (No.125) was a Russian legislative constituency in Novosibirsk Oblast in 1993–2007. The constituency covered northern Novosibirsk and, alongside Zayeltsovsky constituency, is one of the constituencies, that covered urban Novosibirsk. In 2015 Zavodskoy constituency was dismantled and its territory was split between all four Novosibirsk Oblast constituencies.

Members elected

Election results

1993

|-
! colspan=2 style="background-color:#E9E9E9;text-align:left;vertical-align:top;" |Candidate
! style="background-color:#E9E9E9;text-align:left;vertical-align:top;" |Party
! style="background-color:#E9E9E9;text-align:right;" |Votes
! style="background-color:#E9E9E9;text-align:right;" |%
|-
|style="background-color:#78866B"|
|align=left|Ivan Anichkin
|align=left|Dignity and Charity
|
|15.00%
|-
|style="background-color:#DBB726"|
|align=left|Olga Lesnevskaya
|align=left|Democratic Party
| -
|13.30%
|-
| colspan="5" style="background-color:#E9E9E9;"|
|- style="font-weight:bold"
| colspan="3" style="text-align:left;" | Total
| 
| 100%
|-
| colspan="5" style="background-color:#E9E9E9;"|
|- style="font-weight:bold"
| colspan="4" |Source:
|
|}

1995

|-
! colspan=2 style="background-color:#E9E9E9;text-align:left;vertical-align:top;" |Candidate
! style="background-color:#E9E9E9;text-align:left;vertical-align:top;" |Party
! style="background-color:#E9E9E9;text-align:right;" |Votes
! style="background-color:#E9E9E9;text-align:right;" |%
|-
|style="background-color:"|
|align=left|Ivan Anichkin (incumbent)
|align=left|Independent
|
|13.80%
|-
|style="background-color:"|
|align=left|Aleksandr Prosenko
|align=left|Liberal Democratic Party
|
|10.05%
|-
|style="background-color:#D50000"|
|align=left|Frol Ananyin
|align=left|Communists and Working Russia - for the Soviet Union
|
|9.20%
|-
|style="background-color:"|
|align=left|Stanislav Labetsky
|align=left|Independent
|
|9.01%
|-
|style="background-color:"|
|align=left|Gennady Pugachev
|align=left|Our Home – Russia
|
|8.70%
|-
|style="background-color:#FE4801"|
|align=left|Gennady Bessonov
|align=left|Pamfilova–Gurov–Lysenko
|
|6.68%
|-
|style="background-color:"|
|align=left|Pavel Isayev
|align=left|Independent
|
|5.05%
|-
|style="background-color:"|
|align=left|Aleksandr Kiselnikov
|align=left|Independent
|
|4.71%
|-
|style="background-color:#F5A222"|
|align=left|Leonid Agafonov
|align=left|Interethnic Union
|
|4.12%
|-
|style="background-color:#959698"|
|align=left|Anatoly Stolbov
|align=left|Derzhava
|
|3.86%
|-
|style="background-color:"|
|align=left|Aleksandr Zhuravkov
|align=left|Independent
|
|3.26%
|-
|style="background-color:"|
|align=left|Nikolay Mikheyev
|align=left|Independent
|
|1.39%
|-
|style="background-color:#000000"|
|colspan=2 |against all
|
|16.90%
|-
| colspan="5" style="background-color:#E9E9E9;"|
|- style="font-weight:bold"
| colspan="3" style="text-align:left;" | Total
| 
| 100%
|-
| colspan="5" style="background-color:#E9E9E9;"|
|- style="font-weight:bold"
| colspan="4" |Source:
|
|}

1999

|-
! colspan=2 style="background-color:#E9E9E9;text-align:left;vertical-align:top;" |Candidate
! style="background-color:#E9E9E9;text-align:left;vertical-align:top;" |Party
! style="background-color:#E9E9E9;text-align:right;" |Votes
! style="background-color:#E9E9E9;text-align:right;" |%
|-
|style="background-color:"|
|align=left|Galina Strelchenko
|align=left|Unity
|
|15.71%
|-
|style="background-color:"|
|align=left|Aleksey Glazkov
|align=left|Independent
|
|15.69%
|-
|style="background-color:"|
|align=left|Ivan Anichkin (incumbent)
|align=left|Independent
|
|14.76%
|-
|style="background-color:#3B9EDF"|
|align=left|Nadezhda Azarova
|align=left|Fatherland – All Russia
|
|8.02%
|-
|style="background-color:"|
|align=left|Svetlana Smolentseva
|align=left|Communist Party
|
|7.78%
|-
|style="background-color:"|
|align=left|Sergey Kretov
|align=left|Independent
|
|7.47%
|-
|style="background-color:"|
|align=left|Boris Konovalov
|align=left|Yabloko
|
|7.12%
|-
|style="background-color:"|
|align=left|Vladimir Ivankov
|align=left|Independent
|
|5.80%
|-
|style="background-color:"|
|align=left|Yevgeny Gavrilov
|align=left|Independent
|
|1.57%
|-
|style="background-color:"|
|align=left|Sergey Nacharov
|align=left|Independent
|
|1.42%
|-
|style="background-color:"|
|align=left|Georgy Tolmachev
|align=left|Independent
|
|1.28%
|-
|style="background-color:"|
|align=left|Olga Frolova
|align=left|Independent
|
|0.35%
|-
|style="background-color:"|
|align=left|Yevgeny Kulmanov
|align=left|Independent
|
|0.23%
|-
|style="background-color:#000000"|
|colspan=2 |against all
|
|11.00%
|-
| colspan="5" style="background-color:#E9E9E9;"|
|- style="font-weight:bold"
| colspan="3" style="text-align:left;" | Total
| 
| 100%
|-
| colspan="5" style="background-color:#E9E9E9;"|
|- style="font-weight:bold"
| colspan="4" |Source:
|
|}

2003

|-
! colspan=2 style="background-color:#E9E9E9;text-align:left;vertical-align:top;" |Candidate
! style="background-color:#E9E9E9;text-align:left;vertical-align:top;" |Party
! style="background-color:#E9E9E9;text-align:right;" |Votes
! style="background-color:#E9E9E9;text-align:right;" |%
|-
|style="background-color:"|
|align=left|Svyatoslav Nastashevsky
|align=left|Independent
|
|24.28%
|-
|style="background-color:"|
|align=left|Eduard Kozhemyakin
|align=left|United Russia
|
|12.44%
|-
|style="background-color:"|
|align=left|Aleksandr Lyulko
|align=left|Rodina
|
|11.86%
|-
|style="background-color:"|
|align=left|Sergey Klestov
|align=left|Communist Party
|
|11.81%
|-
|style="background-color:"|
|align=left|Galina Strelchenko (incumbent)
|align=left|Independent
|
|6.98%
|-
|style="background-color:"|
|align=left|Ivan Anichkin
|align=left|Independent
|
|4.94%
|-
|style="background-color:"|
|align=left|Igor Gavrilenko
|align=left|Yabloko
|
|2.98%
|-
|style="background-color:"|
|align=left|Vladislav Tiunov
|align=left|Liberal Democratic Party
|
|2.69%
|-
|style="background-color:"|
|align=left|Gennady Bessonov
|align=left|Independent
|
|1.93%
|-
|style="background:#1042A5"| 
|align=left|Yury Kuvshinov
|align=left|Union of Right Forces
|
|1.91%
|-
|style="background:#00A1FF"| 
|align=left|Irina Radzivilo
|align=left|Party of Russia's Rebirth-Russian Party of Life
|
|0.61%
|-
|style="background-color:"|
|align=left|Stanislav Dasmanov
|align=left|Russian Party of Labour
|
|0.50%
|-
|style="background-color:"|
|align=left|Aleksandr Stepanenko
|align=left|Independent
|
|0.48%
|-
|style="background-color:#7C73CC"|
|align=left|Nikolay Marzan
|align=left|Great Russia – Eurasian Union
|
|0.47%
|-
|style="background-color:"|
|align=left|Vladimir Davidenko
|align=left|Independent
|
|0.15%
|-
|style="background-color:#000000"|
|colspan=2 |against all
|
|13.85%
|-
| colspan="5" style="background-color:#E9E9E9;"|
|- style="font-weight:bold"
| colspan="3" style="text-align:left;" | Total
| 
| 100%
|-
| colspan="5" style="background-color:#E9E9E9;"|
|- style="font-weight:bold"
| colspan="4" |Source:
|
|}

References

Obsolete Russian legislative constituencies
Politics of Novosibirsk Oblast